NTV PLUS is a television channel in Nepal. NTV Plus is one of the two program divisions of Nepal Television that was established to serve a different objective than its other division - the national transmission in the year 2060 BS i.e., 2003 AD. Currently, NTV plus is running round clock, 7 days a week.
NTV Plus was set up with a clear vision to reach out to the youth population through its wide range of programs that basically includes entertainment, informative and sports programs. Embracing sheer professionalism, while pursuing its aspiration the channel in a very short span of time has succeeded in garnering immense affection of viewers. In addition to the afore mentioned programs, the broadcasting of other program like World Cup football, Olympic Games, various national and international level sporting events has further helped the channel attract the youth viewers.
As per the set objectives, more than 70% of the programs broadcast on NTV Plus are entertainment based (that includes musicals and tele-films/soaps) while 20% of the programs comprises informative, sports based and others.
NTV Plus has also been broadcasting a LIVE musical program on a daily basis.
Currently transmitted through satellite and terrestrial (currently through 5 terrestrial centers) means, the channel can also be viewed online around the world. NTV Plus aims at establishing additional terrestrial centers in the near future.
At present, 40% of the current population and 27% of the territorial area have an easy access to NTV Plus.

List of programs broadcast by Nepal Television PLUS
Nepali language programs
Maithili Drama Shows
English Documentaries

Reality
 Namaste TV Show
 Wai Wai Quiz
 Maithili Subhaprabhab
 Young Achievers

Past programs
Play It On
Kakigandaki ko sero phero
(2055 B.S)
Aabiral Bagdacha Indrawati(2057 B.S)

Current tele serial
Kakigandaki ko sero phero (Repeat)Sunday-Thursday-9:30pm
Aabiral Bagdacha Indrawati (Repeat)Thursday & Friday-9.00pm

Personnel
Sangita Panta Thapa, Senior Producer and Host

See also
Nepal Television
List of Nepali television stations

References

External links
  About NTV PLUS

Television channels in Nepal
Television channels and stations established in 2003
2003 establishments in Nepal